Drive is the debut EP by American actor/singer/songwriter Scott Grimes, released in 2010.

History
Drive is the follow-up to his 2005 release, Livin' on the Run. His first release was the 1989 A&M album Scott Grimes. This album features songs written during many personal changes for the writing team of Scott Grimes and Dave Harris. Both men, having gone through divorces in 2006, used that experience as the backbone of this release. Songs like "Back into You", "Waiting" and "What Love Is" reflect a somber tone, while others like "Hide", "Corner Pub" and "Soon I Will Be Found" are tongue-in-cheek and fun to listen to. One of the album's highlights is the last track, "(I Don’t Wanna) Let You Go" which Grimes & Harris co-wrote with Julian Lennon and John Spinks of the Outfield.

Music and lyrics
Drive, musically and lyrically is a slight departure from Grimes' previous album Livin' on the Run which was more rock-oriented. Drive is a quieter and soft rock-oriented album with more personal lyrics by Grimes and Harris, who both went through divorces during the writing of this album.

Track listing

Personnel
 Scott Grimes – guitar (acoustic & electric), piano, keyboards, organ, drum programming, synth strings, all vocals, producer
 John Spinks –	guitar (acoustic & electric)
 Sean O'Dwyer – mixing and mastering
 Dave Harris – executive producer

References

2010 debut EPs
Scott Grimes albums